Muodoslompolo is a village in Pajala Municipality in the county of Norrbotten in Sweden, located some 110 km north of Pajala. It had 61 inhabitants in 2010.

References 

Populated places in Pajala Municipality
Norrbotten